Yadavuru is a village in Guntur district of the Indian state of Andhra Pradesh. It is located in Amruthallur mandal of Tenali revenue division.

Government and politics 

Yadavuru gram panchayat is the local self-government of the village. The panchayat has a total of 10 wards and each ward is represented by an elected ward member. The present sarpanch of the gram panchayat is Kurra Nagamalleswari, who got elected in the year 2013.

References 

Villages in Guntur district